Frank Bren (7 September 1943 – 14 April 2018) was an Australian actor, playwright/dramatist, director, translator and author, who was a scholar of international film history. He has written books (on the histories of Polish and Hong Kong cinema), written plays, and acted in Australian film and television roles.

Books and articles
Frank Bren was a scholar of Polish cinema and Chinese cinema film history. His book World Cinema 1: Poland (University of Illinois Press, 1989) is one of the premier resources on the history of Polish cinema.

His book (with Law Kar), Hong Kong Cinema: A Cross-Cultural View (The Scarecrow Press, 2004) is one of the few books to thoroughly document the very early history of Hong Kong cinema, dating back to its beginnings in the 19th century.

Bren was writing a biography of French filmmaker and comedian, Pierre Étaix.

Bren has also written articles on film for international journals such as Far Eastern Economic Review, Screen International, Films and Filming, as well as for newspapers such as Libération and The Asian Wall Street Journal.

Acting career

Film, television and stage
Frank Bren played Colin "The Snake" Adder in Mark Savage's film Sensitive New Age Killer, and co-starred in the Craig Addison movie Betel Nut Girl. He also played two recurring roles, as twin brothers Colin Taylor and Alf Taylor, in the popular Australian TV series Neighbours during the 1990s. In addition, he played "Mr. Nicholson" in the film Hating Alison Ashley. He was preparing a biopic of Chinese-American film director Esther Eng.

In all, Bren has acted in over a dozen roles in Australian television series and movies, including The Flying Doctors, Blue Heelers and Stingers.

Frank Bren wrote and starred in the play A History of Motion Pictures, which ran at La Mama Theatre (Melbourne). He has also written and starred in about a dozen plays since 1967, with runs in London, Amsterdam, and Melbourne. Some of the other plays he both wrote and starred in are The Rise and Fall of Archie Jones (1968), Have You Noticed Your Leg Is Missing? (1969), Odyssey of a Bald Man (1970), Larceny Makes No Noise (1988), Muckrake (1989), Honest! (1993), and Flashback (1997).

Death
Frank Bren died from cancer, aged 74, on 14 April 2018, at the Peter MacCallum Cancer Centre in Melbourne, Victoria. A tribute to his life was held at La Mama Theatre, and further tributes were written by writer John Snadden and film director Mark Savage.

Filmography (selected)

Notes

External links
Official pages
 FrankBren.com  – personal website

Reference material
 Interview with Frank Bren about Neighbours
 Review of A History of Motion Pictures (from Australian Stage)
 Hong Kong Cinema: A Cross-Cultural View (The Scarecrow Press)
 

1943 births
2018 deaths
Australian male film actors
Australian male soap opera actors
Australian male dramatists and playwrights
20th-century Australian dramatists and playwrights
21st-century Australian dramatists and playwrights
Cinema of Hong Kong